The Keeper is a 2009 American action film starring Steven Seagal and directed by Keoni Waxman. It is the first collaboration between Seagal and director Waxman; the two have subsequently made eight more films and two seasons of a limited TV series together.

Plot
Grizzled L.A. cop Roland Sallinger (Steven Seagal) is shot by his corrupt partner during a raid. After recovering, an old friend named Connor Wells (Steph DuVall) hires him to be a bodyguard for his daughter Nikita (Liezl Carstens).  

Roland escorts Nikita to a night club so she can dance with her boyfriend Mason Silver (Arron Shiver), who is a boxer. Roland notices Jason Cross (Luce Raines), a dangerous man.

Later, Mason betrays Connor and leads Nikita into an ambush, with Roland secretly following. Roland kills some kidnappers, but the rest escape with Nikita. 

Cross, who arranged the kidnapping, contacts Connor. Cross demands the deeds to Connor's property, which contains a rich uranium deposit. Connor agrees to exchange the deeds for Nikita at Cross Ranch, then informs Roland. 

At Cross Ranch, Connor hands Cross the deeds, but they are fake. Roland kills Cross's men, and Connor shoots Cross. A SWAT team arrives and takes Cross away. Nikita is reunited with Connor.

Cast
 Steven Seagal as Rolland Sallinger
 Luce Rains as Jason Cross
 Kisha Sierra as Allegra
 Liezl Carstens as Nikita Wells
 Arron Shiver as Mason Silver
 Brian Keith Gamble as Trevor Johnson
 Angela Serrano as Asian Bare Breast / Massage Girl

References

External links
 
 

2009 films
2009 direct-to-video films
2009 action films
20th Century Fox direct-to-video films
American action films
Direct-to-video action films
Films set in Los Angeles
Films directed by Keoni Waxman
2000s English-language films
2000s American films
English-language action films